Somewhere over China is the eleventh studio album by American singer-songwriter Jimmy Buffett.  It was released in January 1982 as MCA 5285 and is the last Buffett album produced by Norbert Putnam.

Songs
In addition to songs written or co-written by Buffett (two with Steve Goodman and two with Michael Utley), the album includes the John Scott Sherrill-penned "Steamer" and Frank Loesser's 1940s standard "On a Slow Boat to China."  Recorded for the album but not included was "Elvis Imitators", also written by Goodman, with Buffett singing an Elvis Presley imitation with the Jordanaires on background vocals.  The song was to be credited to "Freddie and the Fishsticks" and it was later released on Buffett's box set, Boats, Beaches, Bars & Ballads.  "I Heard I Was in Town" was also included on the box set in the Ballads section, but in a slightly different mix than what appears on Somewhere over China; it also makes its only official live recording on Buffett's live EP Live in Key West.

Record World called the single "It's Midnight and I'm Not Famous Yet" a "sharp rocker."

Chart performance
Somewhere over China reached No. 31 on the Billboard 200 album chart.  The song "It's Midnight and I'm Not Famous Yet" hit No. 32 on the new (at the time) Billboard Rock Tracks chart.

Track listing
Side 1:
"Where's the Party" (Jimmy Buffett, Steve Goodman, Bill LaBounty) – 3:37
"It's Midnight and I'm Not Famous Yet" (Jimmy Buffett, Steve Goodman) – 3:49
"I Heard I Was in Town" (Jimmy Buffett, Michael Utley) – 3:36
"Somewhere over China" (Jimmy Buffett) – 5:20

Side 2:
"When Salome Plays the Drum" (Jimmy Buffett) – 3:25
"Lip Service" (Jimmy Buffett, Michael Utley) – 3:57
"If I Could Just Get It on Paper" (Jimmy Buffett) – 3:32
"Steamer" (John Scott Sherrill) – 4:06
"On a Slow Boat to China" (Frank Loesser) – 3:56

Personnel
The Coral Reefer Band:
Jimmy Buffett – vocals, rhythm guitar
Michael Utley – piano, organ, synthesizer
Greg "Fingers" Taylor – harmonica
Harry Dailey – bass
Matt "Matty Dread" Betton – drums, timbales
Josh Leo – electric and acoustic guitar
Barry Chance – electric and acoustic guitar
M.L. Benoit – congas

Additional Reefers:
Farrell Morris – vibes and percussion
Norbert Putnam – upright bass and Casio
Doyle Grisham – pedal steel
Hank DeVito – pedal steel on "If I could Just Get it on Paper"
Deborah McColl – reeferette
Florence "Bambi" Warner – reeferette
Christian Bachellier – reeferette
David Loggins – reeferette
Freddy Fishstick – reeferette

Singles
"It's Midnight And I'm Not Famous Yet" b/w "When Salome Plays The Drum" (Released on MCA 52013 in February 1982)
"Where's The Party" b/w "If I Could Just Get It On Paper" (Released on MCA 52050 in April 1982)

Notes

Jimmy Buffett albums
1982 albums
Albums produced by Norbert Putnam
MCA Records albums